The following is a list of ecoregions in Sudan, as identified by the Worldwide Fund for Nature (WWF).

Terrestrial ecoregions
by major habitat type

Tropical and subtropical moist broadleaf forests

 Ethiopian montane forests

Tropical and subtropical grasslands, savannas, and shrublands

 East Sudanian savanna
 Sahelian Acacia savanna

Montane grasslands and shrublands

 Ethiopian montane grasslands and woodlands

Deserts and xeric shrublands
 East Saharan montane xeric woodlands
 Ethiopian xeric grasslands and shrublands
 Red Sea coastal desert
 Sahara Desert
 South Saharan steppe and woodlands
 Tibesti-Jebel Uweinat montane xeric woodlands

References
 Burgess, Neil, Jennifer D’Amico Hales, Emma Underwood (2004). Terrestrial Ecoregions of Africa and Madagascar: A Conservation Assessment. Island Press, Washington DC.
 Thieme, Michelle L. (2005). Freshwater Ecoregions of Africa and Madagascar: A Conservation Assessment. Island Press, Washington DC.

 
Sudan
Ecoregions